The 1915 San Diego mayoral election was held on April 6, 1915 to elect the mayor for San Diego. John Akerman and Edwin M. Capps received the most votes in the primary election and advanced to the runoff. Capps was then elected mayor with a majority of the votes.

Candidates
Charles F. O'Neall, Mayor of San Diego
Edwin M. Capps, previous Mayor of San Diego
John Akerman, lumber magnate
Andrew Swanson
Robert McNair

Campaign
Incumbent Mayor Charles F. O'Neall stood for re-election as mayor. The main challengers to O'Neall were John Akerman, a Republican, and former mayor Edwin M. Capps, a Democrat. Also contesting the race were Andrew Swanson, a Socialist, and Robert McNair, an independent.

On March 23, 1915, Akerman received the highest number of votes in the primary election, followed by Capps. Akerman and Capps advanced to the general election, while Mayor O'Neall, who received little more than half the votes of the front-running Akerman, was eliminated from contention. On April 6, 1915 Capps received a majority of more than two thousand votes more than Akerman in the runoff and was elected mayor for a second, non-consecutive term.

Primary Election results

General Election results

References

1915
1915 California elections
1915
1915 United States mayoral elections
April 1915 events